Asociación Argentina de Medicina Respiratoria, the "Argentina Association for Respiratory Medicine"  (AAMR) was formed in 1999 and is the professional association for Pulmonologists and respiratory therapists in Argentina.  Working with the American Journal of Medicine and the American Association for Respiratory Care, the AAMR promotes and credentials respiratory clinicians of all types in Argentina.

See also
Registered Respiratory Therapist
National Board for Respiratory Care
American Association for Respiratory Care
American Medical Association

References

Pulmonology and respiratory therapy organizations
Medical and health organisations based in Argentina